The Hsinchu County Stadium, also referred to as Zhubei Dome, is a multi-purpose stadium in Zhubei City, Hsinchu County, Taiwan. Completed in 2005, the stadium consists of an outdoor arena used mostly for football and track and field events and outdoor concerts, and an indoor stadium for multiple sports events, exhibitions, conferences and performances. In 2006, it received the EEWH green building certification.

South Korean SM Town artists held 2 concerts at the outdoor arena, as part of the SM Town Live World Tour III and  SM Town Live World Tour 4 on 9 June 2012 and 21 March 2015 respectively.

Features

 Outdoor arena: IAAF certified track 
 Indoor stadium: Three-floored structure with flexible configuration (seats between 6,000 and 8,000)

See also
 List of stadiums in Taiwan

References

Sports venues in Taiwan
Football venues in Taiwan
Multi-purpose stadiums in Taiwan
Basketball venues in Taiwan